Plantea is a genus of moths of the family Noctuidae.

Species
 Plantea aulombardi (Plante, 1991)
 Plantea fidahusseini (Ronkay, Ronkay, Gyulai and Hacker, 2010)

References
Natural History Museum Lepidoptera genus database
Plantea at funet

Cuculliinae